Laram Q'awa (Aymara larama blue, q'awa little river, "little blue river"  hispanicized spellings Larancagua, Larancahua) is a mountain in Chile situated in the Parinacota Province of the Arica and Parinacota Region, about 5,439 metres (17,845 ft) high. It lies between the Taapaca volcanic complex and the Payachata mountains.

See also
 Quta Qutani lakes

References

Mountains of Chile
Landforms of Arica y Parinacota Region